Uiwang is a city in Gyeonggi Province, South Korea.  It is one of many satellite cities that ring Seoul, making up the Seoul Capital Area.  Its largest immediate urban neighbor is Anyang.  The low peaks of the Gwangju Mountains (including Moraksan) shape the local landscape.

Rail transportation is important in Uiwang, which is home to the Korean Railroad Museum and Korea National Railroad College. Seoul Subway Line 1 passes through the city, as does the Gyeongbu Line. In addition, a terminal of Hanjin container shipping is located here.

Geography
Uiwang lies just south of Seoul. It is bounded to the east by Baegunsan, Barasan, the lower slopes of Cheonggyesan, and Maebongsan; to the south by the city of Suwon, to the west by Ansan, Gunpo, and Anyang; and to the north by Gwacheon.

There are two noteworthy reservoirs in the city: Baegun Lake at the foot of Baegunsan, and Wangsong Lake, by the border with Suwon. Baegun Lake has a number of foreign restaurants, while Wangsong Lake, accessible from Uiwang Station, has a recreational draisine, the Korean Railroad Museum, and Uiwang's Nature Education Park. The source of the Anyangcheon - a tributary of the Han River - is in Uiwang, as is the source of the Haguicheon, itself a tributary of the Anyangcheon. Most of Uiwang is thus drained northwards. However, the Hwanggujicheon's source is also in Uiwang, and this flows south, eventually emptying into the Yellow Sea at Asan Bay.

History

 1 April 1914: Gwangju-gun's Uigok-myeon and Wangnyun-myeon were combined and transferred to Suwon-gun, which renamed it Uiwang-myeon.
 1 October 1936: Ilhyeong-myeon was incorporated into Uiwang-myeon.
 14 August 1949: The district was transferred to Hwaseong-gun, and was renamed Ilwang-myeon.
 1 January 1963: Ilhyeong-myeon was transferred to Suwon City, while the remainder became Uiwang-myeon, now in Siheung-gun..
 1 December 1980: Uiwang-myeon became Uiwang-eup.
 15 February 1983: Woram-ri and Chopyeong-ri, formerly in Hwaseong-gun's Banwol-myeon, were transferred to Uiwang-eup.
 1 March 1983: Naeson-ri, Poil-ri, Cheonggye-ri, and Hagui-ri were put under the jurisdiction of Uiwang-eup's Eastern Branch Office.
 1 January 1989: Uiwang separated from Siheung-gun, forming its own city.

In recent times, Uiwang has developed considerably thanks to the expansion of Anyang. Several districts are also directly connected with Gunpo and Suwon.

Administrative districts
There are six administrative districts:

Climate
Uiwang has a humid continental climate (Köppen: Dwa), but can be considered a borderline humid subtropical climate (Köppen: Cwa) using the  isotherm.

Transport

Rail
The Gyeongbu Line passes through Uiwang, with Seoul Subway Line 1 stopping at Uiwang Station. Cargo trains also deliver to Obong Station.

Road
The Seoul Ring Expressway, Yeongdong Expressway, National Road 1, and the Gwacheon-Bongdam Highway (309) pass through Uiwang.

Education

Higher Education
Uiwang is home to the Uiwang Campus of the Korea National University of Transportation, and Kaywon University of Art and Design.

Further Education
There are five high schools in the city: Gyeonggi Foreign Language High School, Uiwang High School, Baegun High School, Useong High School, and Morak High School.

Secondary Education
Uiwang houses seven middle schools: Baegun Middle School, Gocheon Middle School, Uiwang Middle School, Uiwang Bugok Middle School, Galmoe Middle School, Morak Middle School, and Deokjang Middle School.

Primary Education
There are twelve elementary schools in Uiwang: Uiwang Elementary School, Gocheon Elementary School, Galmoe Elementary School, Uiwang Bugok Elementary School, Wanggok Elementary School, Uiwang Deokseong Elementary School, Deokjang Elementary School, Ojeon Elementary School, Baegun Elementary School, Naeson Elementary School, Morak Elementary School, and Naedong Elementary School.

Government
City Hall, the central library, seniors' social center, health center, and youth centers are all located in Gocheon-dong.

Korea Correctional Service operates the Seoul Detention Center in Uiwang.

Industry
There are many large corporations, such as  Haitai confectionaries, Cheil Industries, Hyundai Rotem, and various trade and logistics companies in Uiwang.

Twin towns – sister cities
Uiwang is twinned with:
  North Little Rock, Arkansas, United States (2000)
  Kimitsu, Chiba, Japan (2002)

See also
 List of cities in South Korea
 Geography of South Korea

References

External links
City government website
 

 
Cities in Gyeonggi Province